Events from 2020 in the Cook Islands.

Incumbents 

 Monarch: Elizabeth II
 Queen's Representative: Tom Marsters
 Prime Minister: Henry Puna

Events 
Ongoing – COVID-19 pandemic in Oceania

March 

 26 March – Prime Minister Henry Puna announced that 'Code Yellow' measures would be in place in the islands, by which public gatherings are restricted.
 28 March – Despite not having any cases, flights from destinations other than New Zealand were cancelled in addition to all non-essential surgeries.

June
 17 June - Prime Minister Henry Puna announces his intention to step down in order to compete for the role of Secretary-General of the Pacific Islands Forum.

August 

 15 August – The government temporarily closed its air borders to any travellers in response to the re-emerging of COVID-19 cases in Auckland, New Zealand.

September 

 23 September – Human rights campaigners urge the islands MPs to abolish Article 64 of the Crimes Act, which criminalises gay men with up to 14 years' imprisonment. The activists call on the lawmakers to abide by the Constitution.

Deaths 
 27 May – Peri Vaevae Pare, former Cabinet Minister.
 4 September
 Joe Williams, former Prime Minister (b. 1934).
 Nandi Glassie, former Cabinet Minister (b. 1951).

References 

2020 in the Cook Islands
2020s in the Cook Islands
Years of the 21st century in the Cook Islands
the Cook Islands